Daniel Dorff (born March 7, 1956) is an American classical composer.

Biography and career 
Dorff was born in New Rochelle, New York, and grew up in Roslyn, New York, graduating from Roslyn High School. 

Dorff graduated magna cum laude from Cornell University and earned his master's degree in composition from the University of Pennsylvania, studying composition with George Crumb, George Rochberg, Karel Husa, Henry Brant, Ralph Shapey, Elie Siegmeister, and Richard Wernick. Dorff served from 1996 through 2015 as composer-in-residence for Symphony in C (formerly The Haddonfield Symphony) in Camden, New Jersey (USA). His works have been commissioned by such ensembles as the Philadelphia Orchestra and Minnesota Orchestra, and performed by groups and individuals including the Baltimore Symphony, Eastman Wind Ensemble, flutists and clarinetists of the Chicago Symphony and Berlin Philharmonic, pianist Marc-André Hamelin, and flutists Jean-Pierre Rampal, Jasmine Choi, Denis Bouriakov, and frequent collaborator Cindy Anne Broz. He has also created arrangements for Sir James Galway and pop musicians Keith Emerson and Lisa Loeb.

Dorff has written many frequently-performed recital works for woodwinds, and music for orchestra, concert band, piano, chorus, and chamber ensembles, including often-neglected instruments such as contrabassoon, piccolo, and tenor saxophone – the best-known of which are Sonatine de Giverny and Flash!, both for piccolo and piano. In addition to his compositional career, Dorff is a clarinetist and saxophonist and was bass clarinetist for the Haddonfield Symphony for 20 years prior to Alan Gilbert appointing him composer-in-residence. He frequently lectures on music engraving and notation, a subject in which he is expert. Dorff is currently vice president of publishing for music publisher Theodore Presser Company; his input has also been sought in the development of leading music notation software.

Works

Narrated works for young audiences 
Dorff has taken a particular interest in exposing young people to classical music; many of his works are written for young audiences, including Three Fun Fables, a setting for narrator and orchestra of familiar Aesop tales; Billy and the Carnival, a narrated guide to the instruments of the orchestra; Blast Off!, a travelog of a trip to outer space (the score to which was flown by NASA on the 100th mission of the Space Shuttle); and familiar stories such as Goldilocks and the Three Bears, The Three Little Pigs, and The Tortoise and the Hare, and Stone Soup: An Operatic Fable in One Delicious Act which has enjoyed well over 1000 performances.
A Treeful of Monkeys for narrator and orchestra (or mixed quintet)
Billy and the Carnival - A Children's Guide to Musical Instruments for narrator and orchestra
Blast Off! for narrator and orchestra
Goldilocks and the Three Bears for narrator and orchestra (or mixed octet)
Old MacDonald Had an Orchestra for narrator and mixed quintet
Take The Orchestra Out to the Ballgame for narrator and orchestra (or mixed quintet)
The Adventures of Mary's Little Lamb for narrator and mixed quintet
The Bear Went Under the Mountain for narrator mixed quintet
The Three Little Pigs for narrator, violin, and cello
The Tortoise and the Hare for narrator and orchestra (or mixed octet)
Three Fun Fables for narrator and orchestra (or mixed octet)

Selected chamber music 
Some chamber pieces composed by Dorff include:
9 Walks Down 7th Avenue for flute and piano
Allegro Volante for xylophone and piano
Andante con Variazioni for flute and clarinet
April Whirlwind for flute and piano
Atomic Turquoise for flute, C trumpet (or viola), and harp
August Idyll for solo flute
Ballade for alto flute, flugelhorn (or bass flute), and piano
BFF's for Eb clarinet and Bb clarinet
Big Sky for flute, viola, and harp
Cape May Breezes for wind quintet
Dance Music for Mr. Mouse for Eb clarinet and piano
Dark Romance for clarinet quartet
Deep Funk, Part 2, Dance Sonata for solo viola  
Desert Dusk for alto flute and cello 
Fanfare and Hustle for brass quintet
Fantasy, Scherzo and Nocturne for saxophone quartet
Fast Walk for saxophone quartet or clarinet quartet or bassoon quartet
Fireworks for flute orchestra
Flash! for piccolo and piano
Flowers of St. Francis, five scenes for solo bass clarinet
Folk Song Suite for two flutes 
For Elise for flute and piano
Hot Spots for Bb Clarinet and English Horn
In a Deep Funk dance set for solo contrabassoon (or bass clarinet)
Invention after BWV 1013 for two flutes
Invention on Mozart's 11-tone Surprise for flute and clarinet
It Takes Four to Tango for sax quartet or clarinet quartet (or many other instrumentations)
Nocturnes for the Nativity for solo flute 
Pastorale (Souvenirs du Frög) for clarinet and piano
Perennials for flute, clarinet, and piano
Perfect Storm for piccolo, flute, and piano
Romanza on a theme of Rochberg for solo piano
Serenade for Flute and Harp
Serenade to Eve, After Rodin for flute and guitar
Shadows for solo timpani 
Snow Angel for flute and piano 
Sonata (Spirit of the Hudson) for bass flute and piano 
Sonata (Three Lakes) for flute and piano 
Sonatina d'Amore for two contrabassoons
Sonatine de Giverny for piccolo and piano
Songs of the Open Road for solo flute
Spark for solo viola
Swans for 2 alto flutes and piano
The Day Things Went Wrong at the Pet Store - 11 Cartoons for Piano
Three Dance Etudes for marimba duo or ensemble
The Seven Chakras for tenor saxophone and piano
The Three Little Pigs for narrator, violin, and cello
Three Romances for flute and clarinet
The Year of the Rabbit for flute quartet or ensemble
Through a Misty Arch for flute ensemble
Trees (after the poem by Joyce Kilmer) for solo flute with narration
Tweet for solo piccolo
The Seven Chakras for tenor saxophone and piano
Two Cats for flute and clarinet
Woodland Reverie for solo flute
Zoe & Xena for piccolo and bass clarinet

Selected orchestral music 
Some orchestral pieces composed by Dorff include:
A Treeful of Monkeys for narrator with orchestra or mixed quintet
Allegro Volante for xylophone and orchestra (or band)
Billy and the Carnival: A Children's Guide to Musical Instruments for narrator and orchestra
Blast Off! for narrator and orchestra
Concertino for flute and orchestra (or piano)
Concerto for Contrabassoon with clarinet, horn, and strings
Flash! for piccolo and orchestra
Goldilocks and the Three Bears for narrator with orchestra or mixed octet
Pachelbel's Christmas (A Merry Melange) for orchestra
Philly Rhapsody for orchestra
Stone Soup: An Operatic Fable in One Act, an opera for young audiences with soloists, mixed choir, and accompaniment
Summer Solstice Concerto for clarinet and string orchestra
Take the Orchestra Out to the Ballgame for narrator and orchestra
The Kiss (after a painting by Gustav Klimt) for orchestra
Three Fun Fables for narrator and orchestra or mixed octet
The Tortoise and the Hare for narrator and orchestra or mixed octet
Symphony of Delusions

Discography
 Andante con Variazioni (Albany Records TROY 1404), Leonard Garrison flute, Shannon Scott clarinet
 April Whirlwind (private label), Angela Massey flute, Vahan Sargsyan piano
 August Idyll (Cantilena Records 66042-2), Laurel Zucker solo flute
 August Idyll (private label), Kristen Stoner 
 Billy and the Carnival: A Children’s Guide to the Instruments (Bridge Records 9229), Ukee Washington narrator, Rossen Milanov conducting Symphony in C
 Blast Off (Bridge Records 9229), Ukee Washington narrator, Rossen Milanov conducting Symphony in C
 Dances and Canons (Albany Records TROY 1404), Leonard Garrison flute, Shannon Scott clarinet
 Fast Walk (Meister Music MM-1016 and MM-1133), Harmo Saxophone Quartet
 Flash! (90002, distr. Harmonia Mundi), Gudrun Hinze piccolo, Markus Zügehor  piano
 Flash! (private label), Kate Prestia-Schaub piccolo, Martin Kennedy  piano
 Flash! (Numar Un MM 52-16), Nicola Mazzanti piccolo, Ferdinando Mussutto piano 
 Goldilocks and the Three Bears (Bridge Records 92292), Ann Crumb narrator, Rossen Milanov conducting Symphony in C 
 It Takes Four to Tango (Farao Classics B108011), Interclarinet Ensemble
 It Takes Four to Tango (Meister Music MM-1016), Harmo Saxophone Quartet
 It Takes Four to Tango (Sea Breeze Records SEAB 3059), The Miles Osland Saxophone Quartet
 Meditation at Perkiomen Creek (Azica Records 71349), Yolanda Kondonassis, harp
 9 Walks Down 7th Avenue (Azica Records 71257), Pamela Youngblood flute, Gabriel Bita piano
 Nocturne Caprice (private label), Mimi Stillman solo flute  
 Pastorale (Souvenirs du Frög) (Albany Records TROY 1404), Shannon Scott clarinet, Rajung Yang piano 
 Perennials (Albany Records TROY 1404), Leonard Garrison flute, Shannon Scott clarinet, Rajung Yang piano
 Serenade to Eve (after Rodin) (Barking Dog Records), Deborah Harris flute, Mike Coates guitar
 Serenade to Eve (after Rodin) (private label), Jenny Cline flute, Carlos Cuestas guitar
 Sonata (Three Lakes) (Centaur Records CRC 3525), Patricia Surman flute, Kostas Chardas piano
 Sonatina d’Amore (Crystal Records CD 349), Burl Lane and Susan Nigro contrabassoons
 Sonatine de Giverny (Crystal Records CD 713), Lois Herbine piccolo, Charles Abramovic piano
 Sonatine de Giverny (Talanton TAL 90002, distr. Harmonia Mundi), Gudrun Hinze piccolo, Markus Zügehor  piano
 The Three Little Pigs (New Focus Recordings FCR108), Auricolae Ensemble
 Three Fun Fables (Bridge Records 92292), Ann Crumb narrator, Rossen Milanov conducting Symphony in C
 Three Little Waltzes (Albany Records TROY 1404), Leonard Garrison flute, Shannon Scott clarinet
 Three Romances (Albany Records TROY 1404), Leonard Garrison flute, Shannon Scott clarinet
 Two Cats (Albany Records TROY 1404), Leonard Garrison flute, Shannon Scott clarinet
 Zoe & Xena: A Romp in the Park (Albany Records TROY 1652), Leonard Garrison piccolo, Shannon Scott bass clarinet

References

External links
Daniel Dorff's website
Daniel Dorff's page at Theodore Presser Company
Daniel Dorff Interview NAMM Oral History Library (2010)

1956 births
Roslyn High School alumni
Flower Hill, New York
Musicians from New Rochelle, New York
Living people
21st-century classical composers
20th-century classical composers
American male classical composers
American classical composers
Cornell University alumni
Classical saxophonists
21st-century American composers
20th-century saxophonists
21st-century American saxophonists
20th-century American composers
Classical musicians from New York (state)
20th-century American male musicians
21st-century American male musicians